Live Shot is an American drama television series that aired on UPN from August 29 to November 28, 1995. It starred Jeff Yagher, Cheryl Pollak, Spencer Klein, Eddie Velez, Antonia Jones, Bruce McGill, Wanda De Jesus, Hill Harper, Sam Anderson, Rebecca Staab, and Michael Watson. Karen Austin, Debra Eisenstadt, Leigh Hall, Ana Gabriel, Evan Arnold, Yolanda Gaskins,  Morgan Hunter, Terry Kiser, Nia Long, Tom Byrd, Marie Marshall, and Chase Masterson were all recurring on the show.

Premise
The show centered on fictional television station, KXZX, in Los Angeles's Re-Action News. It was an ensemble piece, with no true main character. Most notable in the show's run was an early use of an ongoing story arc centering on the murder of a Los Angeles socialite. As the show was canceled with little warning, the story arc was never resolved. Also, sports reporter Lou Waller came out of the closet in the last act of the last episode to air. Consequently, the fallout of this event was never shown.

Cast and characters

Main
 Jeff Yagher as Alex Rydell – The new News Director of KXZX's Re-Action News team.  Immediately before joining the team he was working as a news director for a Boston station.  Alex's wife decides not to join him in LA, and instead sends their son, Sean, to be with the father alone.  One of his problems was dealing both with the stresses of his new job and being a newly single parent.  Throughout the show's short run there was a growing attraction between, Alex and one of his producers, Nancy.  However the show was canceled before the outcome could be decided.
 Cheryl Pollak as Nancy Lockridge – The Eleven O'Clock News producer.  While she was attracted to Alex, she was also reluctant to begin a relationship with him as he was newly separated and had a son, plus he was her boss.  In the final episode that aired it appeared as though Alex's wife might want a reconciliation and Nancy encouraged Alex to give his marriage another try for the sake of his son.
 Spencer Klein as Sean Rydell – Alex's young son.  His mother had chosen not to come to LA and sent him to be with his father alone.
 David Birney as Harry Chandler "The Beacon of Truth" Moore – The vain, pompous senior news anchor at KXZX.  Harry had a love/hate relationship with his co-anchor Sherry Beck.  Despite their constant behind the scenes bickering the two of them had an affair.
 Eddie Velez as Ricardo Sandoval – A 28-year-old study in macho good looks. Ricardo was a "Re-Action News" anchor and reporter who had been known to focus more attention on the creases in his expensive trousers than the story he's been assigned to cover.
 Antonia Jones as Peggy Traynor – The news traffic controller.  From crashing her car with a faulty brake repair job into Helen Forbes' Mercedes Benz to saving the day when a disastrous fight between Tommy Greer and "Fast" Eddie Santini breaks out in the midst of a live broadcast knocking over the camera, Peggy dealt with every issue in the news room with a cheerful disposition and a desire to please.
 Bruce McGill as Joe Vitale  – "Re–Action News" Executive producer.
 Wanda De Jesus as Liz Vega  – Investigative news reporter for "Re–Action News".
 Hill Harper as Tommy Greer  – News reporter for "Re–Action News".
 Sam Anderson as Marvin Seaborne  – News commentor for "Re–Action News".
 Rebecca Staab as Sherry Beck  – The co–anchor of "Re–Action News".
 Michael Watson as 'Fast' Eddie Santini  – A camera operator, specializing in live shots for "Re–Action News".

Recurring
 Karen Austin as Helen Forbes
 Ron Canada as Bill Simon
 David Coburn as Rick Evers
 Debra Eisenstadt as a director
 Leigh Hall as Lissa
 Ana Gabriel as a director
 Evan Arnold as Brian Cayhill
 Yolanda Gaskins as Rayneta
 Morgan Hunter as Spiro Stavros
 Terry Kiser as Raymond Piskoff
 Nia Long as Romona Greer
 Tom Byrd as Sportscaster Lou Waller
 Marie Marshall as Rosie Pomeranz
 Chase Masterson as Sheila Rydell
 Naya Rivera as  Ann

Episodes

References

Citations

Sources

External links

UPN original programming
1995 American television series debuts
1995 American television series endings
Television series by CBS Studios
Television shows set in Los Angeles
Television series about show business
Television series about television